Paris by Night 98: Fly With Us to Las Vegas  is a Paris by Night program produced by Thúy Nga that was filmed at the Theatre for the Performing Arts in Planet Hollywood Resort & Casino on September 18 and 19, 2009 and had a DVD release on December 10, 2009. The show was hosted by Nguyễn Ngọc Ngạn and Nguyễn Cao Kỳ Duyên.

Track listing

Disc 1

Video clip: "Welcome Aboard Flight PBN 098"
Chuyến Bay Hạnh Phúc (Hoài An) - Lưu Bích, Bảo Hân, Tú Quyên, Thủy Tiên, Nguyệt Anh, Như Quỳnh, Như Loan, Hồ Lệ Thu, Ngọc Anh, Hương Thủy, Quỳnh Vi, Minh Tuyết
LK Còn Gì Nữa Đâu, Kiếp Nào Có Yêu Nhau (Phạm Duy) - Trần Thái Hòa, Ngọc Hạ
LK Hai Lối Mộng, Chuyện Chúng Mình, Tàu Đêm Năm Cũ (Trúc Phương) - Hương Lan, Thanh Tuyền
LK Send Me An Angel & So Sad (Lời Việt : Chiêu Nghi) - Dương Triệu Vũ, Lam Anh
Đố vui khán giả
LK Chiều Một Mình Qua Phố, Gọi Tên Bốn Mùa (Trịnh Công Sơn) - Khánh Ly, Thế Sơn
Đố vui khán giả
LK Nhớ Nhau Hoài (Anh Việt Thu) - Quang Lê & Cho Người Vào Cuộc Chiến (Phan Trân) -  Mai Thiên Vân
Phỏng vấn Quang Lê, Mai Thiên Vân
Không Muốn Yêu (Huỳnh Nhật Tân) - Bảo Hân, Lynda Trang Đài, Tommy Ngô
Một Mai Em Rời Xa (Võ Hoài Phúc) - Trịnh Lam, Nguyệt Anh
LK Phố Cũ Vắng Anh (Lời Việt: Minh Tâm) - Minh Tuyết & Sao Phải Cách Xa (Lời Việt : Võ Hoài Phúc) - Nguyễn Thắng
LK Chuyến Tàu 4:55 (Lời Việt : Lê Xuân Trường) - Don Hồ & Boulevard - Như Loan
LK Nụ Cười Biệt Ly (Ngọc Sơn) - Thành An, Nhớ Người Yêu (Hoàng Hoa, Thảo Trang) - Lý Duy Vũ & Mất Nhau Rồi (Ngân Trang) - Duy Trường
Biển Cạn (Kim Tuấn) - Khánh Hà, Bằng Kiều
LK Đoản Khúc Cuối Cho Em (Hoàng Trọng Thụy) - Diễm Sương & Hãy Nói Với Em (Lời Việt : Hà Quang Minh) - Kỳ Phương Uyên
Phỏng vấn Diễm Sương và Kỳ Phương Uyên
LK Đêm Trắng (Võ Hoàng Phúc) - Nguyễn Hưng & Dẫu Biết (Nhật Trung) - Lưu Bích
Dân biểu Quốc hội Hoa Kỳ Joseph Cao
LK Bài Không Tên Số 4 (Vũ Thành An) - Ngọc Anh & Thu Đến Bao Giờ (Lam Phương) -  Hồ Lệ Thu

Disc 2

Giới thiệu kịch
Hài Kịch: Trẻ Mãi Không Già (Nguyễn Ngọc Ngạn) - Thúy Nga, Chí Tài, Hương Thủy, Bé Tí
Đố vui khán giả
Đôi Khi Em Muốn Khóc (Lời Việt : Lê Xuân Trường) - Tú Quyên, Hương Giang
Đố vui khán giả
Tân Cổ: Áo Mới Cà Mau (Tân nhạc : Thanh Sơn, Cổ nhạc : Viễn Châu) - Phi Nhung, Mai Thiên Vân
Video Clip: Thói đời - Nguyễn Ngọc Ngạn, Nguyễn Cao Kỳ Duyên, Kiều Linh
Mơ Ánh Trăng Về (Lời Việt : Như Quỳnh, Huỳnh Gia Tuấn) - Như Quỳnh
Bông Ô Môi (Sơn Hạ) - Quang Lê, Hà Phương
Bất Chợt Tình Yêu (Nguyễn Đức Cường) - Mai Tiến Dũng
LK Nỗi Đau Ấm Thầm (Quốc An) - Quỳnh Vi & Tại Vì Ai (Đăng Khoa) - Lương Tùng Quang
LK Lý Quạ Kêu (Dân ca) - Hương Thủy & Dệt Tầm Gai (Quốc Đại, Thơ : Vi Thùy Linh) - Trần Thu Hà
Đố vui khán giả
LK Đức Huy: Mùa Hè Đẹp Nhất, Bay Đi Cánh Chim Biển, Luôn Luôn Mãi Mãi - Ý Lan, Quang Dũng
Con Đường Màu Xanh (Trịnh Nam Sơn) - Thủy Tiên, Trần Thái Hòa
Một Lần Nữa Xin Có Nhau (Phương Uyên) - Minh Tuyết, Bằng Kiều
I Say Gold (Marc Lavoine) -  Phạm Quỳnh Anh
Finale

Paris by Night
Zappos Theater

vi:Paris By Night 98